Tomasz Ganicz, ps. Polimerek (born 27 August 1966 in Łódź), is a Polish chemist, doctor habilitas of chemical sciences and professor extraordinarius at the Military University of Technology in Warsaw. He was the president of Wikimedia Polska (2007–2018).

Life 
He graduated from chemistry at the Technical University of Lodz (1991).

See also
 List of Wikipedia people

References 

1966 births
Living people
Łódź University of Technology alumni
Open content activists
Scientists from Łódź
Polish chemists
Polish Wikimedians

Left Together politicians